Jan De Vos may refer to:

 Jan de Vos (historian) (1936–2011), Belgian historian
 Jan De Vos (politician) (1844–1923), Belgian politician